Tricia Hersey is an American poet, performance artist, and activist best known as the founder of the organization The Nap Ministry. She refers to herself as the Nap Bishop and advocates for the importance of rest as a racial and social justice issue.

Early life and education 
Hersey was born and raised on the south side of Chicago. She received her bachelor's degree in public health from Eastern Illinois University. Hersey completed two years of service as a  Peace Corps volunteer in Morocco.

Hersey enrolled in divinity school at Candler School of Theology at Emory University as protests related to Black Lives Matter were beginning. After she experienced stress related to her graduate program, deaths in her family, and being robbed with her young son, Hersey began taking naps more often. She was also influenced by the memory of her grandmother, who meditated regularly in Hersey's childhood. The additional rest made her feel healthier and more energized, and she began to incorporate rest into her graduate research topics of black liberation theology, somatics, and cultural trauma. Hersey received a Master of Divinity degree from the Candler School of Theology.

Career 
Hersey's work argues that sleep deprivation is a racial and social justice issue, and calls for rest as a form of resistance to white supremacy and capitalism. Hersey ties rest to American slavery, when enslaved Africans were regularly sleep deprived, and believes that rest disrupts that history and contemporary "grind culture". She contends that rest is key to Black liberation because it allows space for healing and invention. Hersey has tied Black exhaustion to continued experiences of oppression.

The Nap Ministry 
Hersey founded The Nap Ministry in 2016, an organization that advocates for rest as a form of reparations and a pathway to ancestral connection. The organizations seeks to de-stigmatize self-care and sleep. She spent the first year networking and developing the organization, and hosted the first nap experience in May 2017. Hersey refers to herself as the Nap Bishop and has described the organization as spiritual rather than religious.

The organization hosts nap collective experiences based in Atlanta, where people nap together for 30–40 minutes. Hersey has also hosted pop-up sessions in Chicago. The organization's Instagram has 462,000 followers as of March 2022.

Personal life 
Hersey resides in Atlanta with her husband. She has a son.

References

External links 

 Official website

Year of birth missing (living people)
Living people
African-American activists
American performance artists
African-American poets
Candler School of Theology alumni
People from Chicago
African-American founders
African-American women artists
21st-century African-American women
African-American women musicians